Benny Steck (May 5, 1921 – October 22, 2012) was a Canadian football player who played for the Ottawa Rough Riders and Montreal Alouettes. He won the Grey Cup with Ottawa in 1951. Steck was born to Latvian immigrants in Montreal, where he played junior and senior football. He was later a grocer. He died in Ottawa in 2012.

References

1921 births
Canadian football people from Montreal
Players of Canadian football from Quebec
Montreal Alouettes players
Ottawa Rough Riders players
Canadian people of Latvian descent
2012 deaths